Navaratri is an annual Hindu festival observed in the honour of the goddess Ambika and Durga. It spans over nine nights (and ten days), first in the month of Chaitra (March/April of the Gregorian calendar), and again in the month of Sharada. It is observed for different reasons and celebrated differently in various parts of the Hindu Indian cultural sphere. 

Theoretically, there are four seasonal Navaratri. However, in practice, it is the post-monsoon autumn festival called Sharada Navaratri. The festival is celebrated in the bright half of the Hindu calendar month Ashvin, which typically falls in the Gregorian months of September and October.

Etymology and nomenclature
The word Navaratri means 'nine nights' in Sanskrit, nava meaning nine and ratri meaning nights.

Dates and celebrations
In the eastern and northeastern states of India, the Durga Puja is synonymous with Navaratri, wherein goddess Durga battles and emerges victorious over the buffalo demon Mahishasura to help restore dharma. In southern states, the victory of Durga or Kali is celebrated. In the western state of Gujarat, Navaratri celebrations are constituted by Arti, followed by Garba. In all cases, the common theme is the battle and victory of good over evil based on a regionally famous epic or legend such as the Devi Mahatmya.

Celebrations
Celebrations include worshipping nine goddesses during nine days, stage decorations, recital of the legend, enacting of the story, and chanting of the scriptures of Hinduism. The nine days are also a major crop season cultural event, such as competitive design and staging of pandals, a family visit to these pandals, and the public celebration of classical and folk dances of Hindu culture. Hindu devotees often celebrate Navaratri by fasting. On the final day, called Vijayadashami, the statues are either immersed in a water body such as a river or ocean, or the statue symbolising the evil is burnt with fireworks, marking the destruction of evil. During this time preparations also take place for Deepavali (the festival of lights) which is celebrated twenty days after Vijayadashami.

Dates
According to some Hindu texts such as the Shakta and Vaishnava Puranas, Navaratri theoretically falls twice or four times in a year. Of these, the Sharada Navaratri near autumn equinox (September–October) is the most celebrated and the Vasanta Navaratri near spring equinox (March–April) is the next most significant to the culture of the Indian subcontinent. In all cases, Navaratri falls in the bright half of the Hindu lunisolar months. The celebrations vary by region, leaving much to the creativity and preferences of the Hindu.

Sharada Navaratri
Sharada Navaratri is the most celebrated of the four Navaratri, named after Sharada which means autumn. It commences on the first day (pratipada) of the bright fortnight of the lunar month of Ashvini. The festival is celebrated for nine nights once every year during this month, which typically falls in the Gregorian months of September and October. The exact dates of the festival are determined according to the Hindu lunisolar calendar, and sometimes the festival may be held for a day more or a day less depending on the adjustments for sun and moon movements and the leap year. In many regions, the festival falls after the autumn harvest, and in others, during harvest.

The festivities extend beyond goddess Durga and various other goddesses such as Saraswati and Lakshmi. Deities such as Ganesha, Kartikeya, Shiva, and Parvati are regionally revered. For example, a notable pan-Hindu tradition during Navaratri is the adoration of Saraswati, the Hindu goddess of knowledge, learning, music, and arts, through Ayudha Puja. On this day, which typically falls on the ninth day of Navaratri, peace and knowledge is celebrated. Warriors thank, decorate, and worship their weapons, offering prayers to Saraswati. Musicians upkeep, play, and pray their musical instruments. Farmers, carpenters, smiths, pottery makers, shopkeepers, and all sorts of tradespeople similarly decorate and worship their equipment, machinery, and tools of trade. Students visit their teachers, express respect, and seek their blessings. This tradition is particularly strong in South India, but is observed elsewhere too.

Chaitra Navaratri

Chaitra Navaratri, also called Vasantha Navaratri, is the second most celebrated Navaratri, named after vasanta which means spring. It is observed during the lunar month of Chaitra (March–April). The festival is devoted to goddess Durga, whose nine forms are worshipped on nine days. The last day is also Rama Navami, the birthday of Rama. For this reason, it is also called Rama Navaratri by some people.

In many regions, the festival falls after spring harvest, and in others, during harvest. It also marks the first day of the Hindu lunisolar calendar, also known as the Hindu Lunar New Year, according to the Vikram Samvat calendar.

Magha Navaratri
Magha Navaratri is observed during the lunar month of Magha (January–February). This Navaratri is also known as Gupt (secret) Navaratri. The fifth day of this festival is often independently observed as Vasant Panchami or Basant Panchami, the official start of spring in the Hindu tradition, wherein goddess Saraswati is revered through arts, music, writing, and kite flying. In some regions, the Hindu god of love, Kama is revered. Magha Navaratri is observed regionally or by individuals.

Ashada Navaratri
Ashada Navaratri, also known as Gupta Navaratri, is observed during the lunar month of Ashadha (June–July), during the start of the monsoon season. Ashada Navaratri is observed regionally or by individuals.

Significance of each day

The festival is associated to the prominent battle that took place between Durga and the demon Mahishasura to celebrate the victory of good over evil. These nine days are solely dedicated to Durga and her nine avatars – the Navadurga. Each day is associated to an incarnation of the goddess:

Day 1 – Shailaputri
Known as Pratipada (first day), this day is associated with Shailaputri ("Daughter of Mountain"), an incarnation of Parvati. It is in this form that Durga is worshipped as the daughter of Himavan (the Guardian God of Himalaya); she is depicted as riding the bull, Nandi, with a trishula in her right hand and lotus in her left. Shailaputri is considered to be the direct incarnation of Mahakali. The colour of the day is yellow, which depicts action and vigor. She is also considered to be a reincarnation of Sati (Shiva’s first wife, who then reincarnates as Parvati) and is also known as Hemavati.

Day 2 – Brahmacharini
On Dwitiya (second day), Goddess Brahmacharini, another incarnation of Parvati, is worshipped. In this form, Parvati became Yogini, her unmarried self. Brahmacharini is worshipped for emancipation or moksha and endowment of peace and prosperity. Depicted as walking bare feet and holding a japamala (rosary) and a kamandala (pot) in her hands, she symbolizes bliss and calm. Green is the colour code of this day. The orange colour which depicts tranquility is sometimes used so that strong energy flows everywhere.

Day 3 – Chandraghanta

Tritiya (third day) commemorates the worship of Chandraghanta – the name derived from the fact that after marrying Shiva, Parvati adorned her forehead with the ardhachandra (lit. half-moon). She is the embodiment of beauty and is also symbolic of bravery. Grey is the colour of the third day, which is a vivacious colour and can cheer up everyone's mood.

Day 4 – Kushmanda
Goddess Kushmanda is worshipped on Chaturthi (fourth day). Believed to be the creative power of the universe, Kushmanda is associated with the endowment of vegetation on earth, and hence, the colour of the day is orange. She is depicted as having eight arms and sits on a Tiger.

Day 5 – Skandamata
Skandamata, the goddess worshipped on Panchami (fifth day), is the mother of Skanda (or Kartikeya). The white colour is symbolic of the transforming strength of a mother when her child is confronted with danger. She is depicted riding a ferocious lion, having four arms, and holding her baby.

Day 6 – Katyayani
Born to sage Katyayana, she is an incarnation of Durga and is shown to exhibit courage which is symbolized by the colour red. Known as the warrior goddess, she is considered one of the most violent forms of Devi. In this avatar, Katyayani rides a lion and has four hands. She is a form of Parvati, Mahalakshmi, Mahasaraswati. She is celebrated on Shashtami (sixth day). In eastern India, Maha Shashti is observed on this day and starting of shardiya Durga Puja.

Day 7 – Kaalaratri
Considered the most ferocious form of Goddess Durga, Kalaratri is revered on Saptami. It is believed that Parvati removed her pale skin to kill the demons Sumbha and Nisumbha. The colour of the day is royal blue. The Goddess appears in a red-coloured attire or tiger skin with a lot of rage in her fiery eyes, her skin turns dark. The red colour portrays prayer and assures the devotees that the Goddess will protect them from harm. She is celebrated on Saptami (seventh day). In eastern India, Maha Saptami is observed on this day and Bodhon of shardiya Durga Puja.

Day 8 – Mahagauri
Mahagauri symbolizes intelligence and peace. It is believed when Kaalaratri took a bath in the Ganga river, she gained a warmer complexion. The colour associated with this day is pink which depicts optimism. She is celebrated on Ashtami (eighth day).  In eastern India, Maha Astami is observed on this day and starting with pushpanjali, kumari puja etc. It's a very important tithi and considered as birth day of Mahishasura mardini rupa of Chandi.

Day 9 – Siddhidatri
On the last day of the festival also known as Navami (ninth day), people pray to Siddhidhatri. Sitting on a lotus, she is believed to possess and bestows all types of Siddhis. Here she has four hands. Also known as Mahalakshmi, The purple colour of the day portrays an admiration towards nature's beauty. Siddhidatri is Parvati, the wife of Lord Shiva. Siddhidhatri is also seen as the Ardhanarishvara form of Shiva and Shakti. It is believed that one side of Lord Shiva’s body is that of Goddess Siddhidatri. Therefore, he is also known by the name of Ardhanarishwara. According to Vedic scriptures, Lord Shiva attained all the siddhis by worshipping this Goddess.

In most parts of India, tools and weapons are worshiped in a ritual called Ayudha Puja. Many businesses also grant a holiday to their employees on this day.

Regional practices
Navaratri is celebrated in different ways throughout India. Certain people revere different aspects of Durga and some people fast while others feast. The Chaitra Navaratri culminates in Ram Navami and the Sharada Navaratri culminates in Durga Puja and Vijayadashami.

In the past, Shakta Hindus used to recite Durga's legends during the Chaitra Navaratri, but this practice around the spring equinox has been declining. For most contemporary Hindus, it is the Navaratri around the autumn equinox that is the major festival and the one observed. To Bengali Hindus and to Shakta Hindus outside of eastern and northeastern states of India, the term Navaratri implies Durga Puja in the warrior goddess aspect of Devi. In other traditions of Hinduism, the term Navaratri implies the celebration of Durga but in her more peaceful forms, such as Saraswati – the Hindu goddess of knowledge, learning, music, and other arts. In Nepal, Navaratri is called Dashain, and is a major annual homecoming and family event that celebrates the bonds between elders and youngsters with Tika Puja, as well as across family and community members.

Eastern Indian subcontinent 

Navaratri is celebrated as the Durga Puja festival by Bengalis, Odia people, Assamese people, Bihari people, Tripuri people, Maithils, Nepalese people, Bhutanese people, Burmese people as well as some minor tribal ethnicities in Bangladesh and India such as Santal people, Chakma people, Manipuri people and others. It is the most important annual festival to Bengali Hindus and a major social and public event in eastern and northeastern states of India, where it dominates the religious life. The occasion is celebrated with thousands of pandals (temporary stages) that are built in community squares, roadside shrines, and large Durga temples in West Bengal, Odisha, Jharkhand, Bihar, eastern Nepal, Assam, Tripura, and nearby regions. It is also observed by some Shakta Hindus as a private, home-based festival. Durga Puja festival marks the victory of the goddess Durga in the battle against the shape-shifting, deceptive, and powerful buffalo demon Mahishasura.

The festival begins with Mahalaya, a day where Shakta Hindus remember the loved ones who have died, as well the advent of the warrior goddess Durga. The next significant day of Durga Puja is called Shashthi, on which the local community welcomes the goddess Durga and festive celebrations are inaugurated. On the seventh (Saptami), eighth (Ashtami), and ninth (Navami) day, Durga, along with Lakshmi, Saraswati, Ganesha, and Kartikeya, are revered. These days mark the main Puja (worship) which is performed by the recitation of scriptures, legends of Durga in the Devi Mahatmya, and social visits by families to temples and pandals. On the tenth day, also known as Vijayadashami, a great procession is held where clay statues of Durga are ceremoniously walked to a river or ocean coast for a solemn goodbye. Many mark their faces with vermilion (sindooram) or dress in red clothes. It is an emotional day for some devotees, and the congregation sings emotional goodbye songs. After the procession, Hindus distribute sweets, gifts, and visit their friends and family members.

North India

In North India, Navaratri is marked by the numerous Ramlila events, where episodes from the story of Rama and Ravana are enacted by teams of artists in rural and urban centers, inside temples, or in temporarily constructed stages. This Hindu tradition of festive performance arts was inscribed by UNESCO as one of the "Intangible Cultural Heritage of Humanity" in 2008. The festivities, states UNESCO, include songs, narration, recital and dialogue based on the Hindu text Ramcharitmanas by Tulsidas. It is particularly notable in the historically important Hindu cities of Ayodhya, Varanasi, Vrindavan, Almora, Satna and Madhubani – cities in Uttar Pradesh, Uttarakhand, Bihar, and Madhya Pradesh.

The festival and dramatic enactment of the story is organized by communities in hundreds of small villages and towns, attracting a mix of audiences from different social, gender. and economic backgrounds. In many parts, the audience and villagers join in and participate spontaneously, some helping the artists, others helping with stage set up, create make-up, effigies, and lights.

Navaratri has historically been a prominent ritual festival for kings and military of a kingdom. At the end of the Navaratri, comes Dussehra, where the effigies of Ravana, Kumbhakarna, and Indrajit are burnt to celebrate the victory of good (Rama) over evil forces.

Elsewhere, during this religious observance, goddess Durga's war against deception and evil is remembered. A pot is installed (ghatasthapana) at a sanctified place at home. A lamp is kept lit in the pot for nine days. The pot symbolizes the universe and the uninterrupted lit lamp symbolizes Durga.

Bihar
In parts of Bihar, Durga is revered during the autumn of Navaratri. A huge number of pandals are made. In Bihar, Durga is worshipped alongside Lakshmi, Saraswati, Kartikey, and Ganesha. In other parts like Sitamarhi and close to the Nepal border, the spring Navaratri attracts a large Rama Navami fair, which marks the birth of Lord Rama. It is the largest cattle trading fair and attracts a large handicraft market in pottery, kitchen, and housewares, as well as traditional clothing. Festive performance arts and celebrations are held at the local Hindu temple dedicated to Sita, Hanuman, Durga, and Ganesha.

Gujarat
Navaratri in Gujarat is one of the state's main festivals. The traditional celebrations include fasting for a day, or partially fasting each of the nine days by not eating grains or just taking liquid foods, in remembrance of one of nine aspects of Shakti goddess. The prayers are dedicated to a symbolic clay pot called garbo, as a remembrance of the womb of the family and universe. The clay pot is lit, and this is believed to represent the one Atman (soul, self).

In Gujarat and nearby Hindu communities such as in Malwa, the garbo significance is celebrated through performance arts on all nine days. The most visible is group dances called Garba accompanied by live orchestra, seasonal raga, or devotional songs. It is a folk dance where people of different background and skills join and form concentric circles. The circles can grow or shrink, reaching sizes of hundreds or thousands of people, dancing and clapping in circular moves in their traditional attire. The garba dance sometimes deploys dandiyas (sticks), coordinated movements and the striking of sticks between the dancers, and teasing between the genders. Post dancing, the group and the audience socializes and feasts together. Regionally, the same thematic celebration of community songs, music, and dances on Navaratri is called garbi.

Goa

In the temples of Goa, on the first day of the Hindu month of Ashwin, a copper pitcher, surrounded by clay, is installed inside the sanctum sanctorum of Devi and Krishna temples, in which nine varieties of food grains are placed. The nine nights are celebrated through devotional songs and religious discourses. Artists arrive to perform folk musical instruments. Celebrations include placing Durga's image in a specially-decorated colourful silver swing, known as Makhar, and for each of the nine nights, swinging Her to the tune of temple music (called as ranavadya). This is locally called Makharotsav.

The last night of the Goa Navaratri festival is a major celebration called the makhar arti.

Karnataka

In Karnataka, Navaratri is observed at home and by lighting up Hindu temples, cultural sites, and many regal processions. It is locally called Dasara and it is the state festival (Naadahabba) of Karnataka. Of the many celebrations, the Mysuru Dasara is a major one and is popular for its festivities.

The contemporary Dasara festivities at Mysore are credited to the efforts of King Raja Wodeyar I in 1610. On the ninth day of Dasara, called Mahanavami, the royal sword is worshipped and is taken on a procession of decorated elephants and horses. Also, Ayudha Puja is dedicated to Saraswati, in which military personnel upkeep their weapons and families upkeep their tools of livelihood, both offering a prayer to Saraswati, as well as Parvati and Lakshmi. The day after Navaratri, on Vijayadashami, the traditional Dasara procession is held on the streets of Mysore. An image of the Goddess Chamundeshwari is placed on a golden saddle (hauda) on the back of a decorated elephant and taken on a procession, accompanied by tableaux, dance groups, music bands, decorated elephants, horses, and camels.

Another Navaratri tradition in Karnataka has been decorating a part of one's home with art dolls called Gombe or Bombe, similar to Golu dolls of Tamil Nadu. An art-themed Gaarudi Gombe, featuring folk dances that incorporate these dolls, is also a part of the celebration.

Kerala

In Kerala, three days (Ashtami, Navami, and Vijayadashami) of Sharada Navaratri are celebrated as Sarasvati Puja in which books are worshipped. The books are placed for Puja on  Ashtami in their own houses, traditional nursery schools, or in temples. On Vijayadashami, the books are ceremoniously taken out for reading and writing after worshipping Sarasvati. Vijayadashami is considered auspicious for initiating the children into writing and reading, which is called Vidyarambham.

The Vidyarambham day tradition starts with the baby or child sitting on the lap of an elderly person such as the grandfather, near images of Saraswati and Ganesha. The elder writes a letter and the child writes the same with his or her index finger.

Maharashtra
Navaratri celebrations vary across Maharashtra and the specific rites differ between regions, even if they are called the same and dedicated to the same deity. The most common celebration begins on the first day of Navaratri with Ghatasthapana, which literally means "mounting of a jar". On this day, rural households mount a copper or brass jar, filled with water, upon a small heap of rice kept on a wooden stool (pat). The jar is typically placed other agriculture symbols such as a turmeric root, leaves of a mango tree, coconut, and major staple grains (usually eight varieties). A lamp is lighted symbolising knowledge and household prosperity, and kept alight through the nine nights of Navaratri.

The family worships the pot for nine days by offering rituals and a garland of flowers, leaves, fruits, dry-fruits, etc. with a naivedya, and water is offered in order to get the seeds sprouted. Some families also celebrate Kali puja on days 1 and 2, Laxmi puja on days 3, 4, 5 and Saraswati puja on days 6, 7, 8, 9 along with Ghatasthapana. On the eighth day, a "Yajna" or "Hom" is performed in the name of Goddess Durga. On the ninth day, the Ghat puja is performed and the Ghat is dismantled after taking off the sprouted leaves of the grains.

The Goddess Lalita is worshiped on the fifth day of the festival. On the ninth day of the festival, men participate in worshiping all kinds of tools, weapons, vehicles, and productive instruments.

Tamil Nadu
Navaratri has been a historic tradition within Tamil Nadu, with Lakshmi, Saraswati, and Durga goddesses as the focus. Like the rest of India, the festival has been an occasion for performance arts, particularly Hindu temple dances such as Bharatanatyam and Mohiniyattam. Major palaces, community centers, and historic temples have embedded dance halls. For example, the Padmanabhapuram Palace built about 1600 CE has had a large dance hall with intricately carved pillars, a structure entirely made of stone. This dance hall has traditionally been known as Navaratri Mantapa. The festivities begin with Vedic chants inaugurating the dances and other ceremonies. Other Tamil Hindu temples, such as those associated with Sri Vaishnavism, also celebrate the Navaratri festivities.

Another notable Tamil tradition is a celebration of the festival with Golu dolls (also spelled as Gollu). These include gods, goddesses, animals, birds and rural life all in a miniature design. People set up their own creative themes in their homes, called Kolu, friends and families invite each other to visit their homes to view Kolu displays, then exchange gifts and sweets. This tradition is also found in other parts of South India such as Andhra Pradesh where it called Bommala Koluvu, and Karnataka where it is called Gombe Habba or Gombe totti. Evidence of Gombe totti tradition as a Hindu celebration of the artisan arts goes back to at least the 14th-century Vijayanagara Empire. In the evening of Vijayadashami, any one doll from the "Kolu" is symbolically put to sleep and the Kalasa is moved a bit towards the North to mark the end of that year's Navaratri Kolu. The family offers a prayer of thanks, and wraps up the display.

In temples of Tamil Nadu, Navaratri is celebrated for Durga's dwelling in each temple. The temples are decorated, ceremonial lamps are lit, and Vedic chantings are performed. Priests and visitors of some of these temples wear a special yellow coloured 'promise of protection' thread on their wrists, called kappu (Tamil) or raksha bandhana (Sanskrit). It is believed to symbolize a vow to the goddess and protection from the goddess against evil.

Telangana

In Telangana, Navaratri is celebrated as in the rest of India and it ends with Dasara. During the Navaratri nights, a notable Telangana tradition involves Telugu Hindu women who produce Bathukamma for Navaratri goddesses. It is an artistic flower decorations driven event, particularly using marigolds, which revere three different aspects Devi, called Tridevi. In 2016, 9,292 women simultaneously participated to create a 20 feet high flower arrangements, one of the world's largest festive flower arrangement.

Bathukamma celebrations will be started with the Mahalaya Amavasya (Pitru Amavasya), a day before Navaratri starts. The main deity of worship is goddess Gowri, a form of goddess Durga, who is symbolized with a idol made from turmeric powder and is placed on a floral arrangement called bathukamma. The festival will go for nine nights with women whirling around the bathukamma clapping their hands or sticks along with the recitation of the Ramayana, stories of Shiva, Gowri, Ganga, and common day-to-day life of women in the form of rhythmic songs. Every night, bathukamma is immersed in nearby water resources and a new bathukamma is made next day. This nine nights festival ends with Durgashtami, when Durga is believed to be worshiped in the form of Maha Gowri.

Like elsewhere in India, Ayudha Puja is observed by Telangana Hindus where weapons are maintained, decorated, and worshiped. Tradesmen and farmers similarly clean up, decorate, and worship their own equipment of the trade. On the 10th day, Dussehra (Vijayadashami), grand feasts are arranged with family members and friends.

Animal sacrifice
Although rare, animal sacrifice is a part of some Durga puja celebrations during Navaratri in the eastern states of India. The goddess is offered a sacrificial animal in this ritual in the belief that it stimulates her violent vengeance against the buffalo demon. According to Christopher Fuller, the animal sacrifice practice is rare among Hindus during Navaratri, or at other times, outside the Shaktism tradition found in the eastern Indian states of West Bengal, Odisha, and Assam.  Even in these states, the festival season is one where significant animal sacrifices are observed. In some Shakta Hindu communities, the slaying of the buffalo demon and the victory of Durga are observed with a symbolic sacrifice instead of animal sacrifice.

The Rajput of Rajasthan worship their weapons and horses on Navaratri, and formerly offered a sacrificial goat to a goddess revered as Kuldevi – a practice that continues in some places. The ritual requires the slaying of the animal with a single stroke. In the past, this ritual was considered a rite of passage into manhood and readiness as a warrior. 

The tradition of animal sacrifice is being substituted with vegetarian offerings to the Goddess in temples and households around Banaras in Northern India.

Outside India
The Hindu diaspora that migrated as indentured servants during colonial era to various plantations and mines around the world, as well as those who migrated on their own, continued to mark their Navaratri traditions. Hindus in Malaysia, Singapore,Thailand, and Sri Lanka for example, built Hindu temples in southeast Asia in the 19th century, and Navaratri has been one of their major traditional festivals. In Trinidad and Tobago, Guyana, Suriname, Fiji, Mauritius, Canada, South Africa, the United States, and the United Kingdom, Navaratri and Diwali have been one of the most visible celebrations of the local Hindu communities from about mid 20th-century.

Other religions
Navaratri and goddess worship is mentioned in the historic Sikhism literature, particularly in the Dasam Granth traditionally attributed to Guru Gobind Singh. According to Louis Fenech, the Sikhs have historically mirrored the reverence for Devi Shakti and the worship of weapons in a manner similar to those by Shakta Hindus. The second Guru of Sikhism, Guru Angad, was an ardent devotee of goddess Durga.

The Jains have observed the social and cultural celebrations of Navaratri with Hindus, such as the folk dances. The stavan poetry of Jainism, states M. Whitney Kelting, "draw much of their imagery from the garba poems" of Hinduism.

It takes place at the same time as the Nine Emperor Gods Festival.

See also
 Navratra Akhand Jyoti
 Durga Puja
 Garba
 Jhandewalan Temple
 Jwala Devi Temple (Uttar Pradesh)
 Jyoti Kalash
 Mysore Dasara
 Bathukamma
 Nine Emperor Gods Festival
 Vijayadashami
 Dashain

Notes

References

Bibliography

External links
 Navratri Festival 

Hindu festivals
Festivals in India
Festivals in Nepal
Gujarati culture
Hindu festivals in India
September observances
October observances